The Pitchfork Music Festival 2011 was held on July 15 to 17, 2011 at the Union Park, Chicago, United States. The festival was headlined by Animal Collective, Fleet Foxes and TV on the Radio.

Lineup
Headline performers are listed in boldface. Artists listed from latest to earliest set times.

References

External links

Pitchfork Music Festival
2011 music festivals